All Saints' Church is an Anglican church in Madeley, Staffordshire, England, and in the Diocese of Lichfield. The building dates mostly from the 14th and 15th centuries, and the chancel was rebuilt in the 19th century. It is Grade I listed.

Description
A church on the site is first recorded in the late 10th century. The earliest surviving part of the church, the arcade on the north side of the nave, dates from the late 12th century. The wide, pointed chancel arch is early 13th century, and the north aisle is of the 14th century. There are north and south transepts (unusual in a small parish church) dating from the 15th century; also of the 15th century are the north chancel chapel (now a vestry), the clerestory, and the tower.

Monuments
There is in the north transept an alabaster tomb chest for Randolph Egerton (died 1512) and his wife; in the south transept, a memorial to John Crewe Offley (died 1688); in the floor, a brass to John Egerton (died 1518) and his wife; and on the east wall, tablets to Sir Holland Egerton of the Egerton family (died 1730) and his wife.

Restoration
In restoration of 1872 largely funded by Lord Crewe, the chancel, originally of the 13th century, was rebuilt by Charles Lynam. It has a panelled, painted ceiling, and the east window is by Clayton and Bell. The window in the west end of the south aisle is by Morris & Co. and has figures by William Morris, Ford Madox Brown and Edward Burne-Jones.

During 2007 to 2009, a new reredos was installed, replacing the 1872 reredos that was later lost; new lighting was installed; and hidden tile work of 1872 in the chancel was revealed.

See also
 Listed buildings in Madeley, Staffordshire

References

Grade I listed churches in Staffordshire
Church of England church buildings in Staffordshire
Diocese of Lichfield